This is a list of the more notable Christian shrines around the world.

Africa

Algeria 
 Notre Dame d'Afrique, Algiers

Cameroon 
 Basilique Marie-Reine-des-Apôtres (Mary Queen of the Apostles Basilica) in Yaoundé.

Egypt 
 Our Lady of Warraq, Giza
 Shrine of Saint Abanoub - Virgin Mary & St. Abanoub Coptic Orthodox Church, Samanoud 
 Monastery of Saint Macarius the Great, Shrine of Saint John the Baptist & Elisha the Prophet
 Monastery of Saint Macarius the Great, Shrine of Saints Macarius the Great, Macarius of Alexandria, Macarius of the Bishop & Saint John the Short
 Syrian Monastery, Egypt, Shrine of Mary Magdalene & Shrine of Father Faltaous El-Souriani
 Coptic Monastery of Saint Fana, Shrine of Saint Fana
 Saint Mark's Coptic Orthodox Cathedral (Alexandria), Shrine of Saint Mark the Evangelist
 Saint Mark's Coptic Orthodox Cathedral, Cairo, Shrine of Saint Athanasius
 Saint Mark’s Coptic Orthodox Cathedral, Cairo Shrine of Father Mikhail Ibrahim
 Saint Anthony the Great Coptic Orthodox Monastery, Eastern Desert, Shrine of Anba Anthony the Great
 Paromeos Monastery, Shrine of Saints Maximus & Domitius
 Monastery of Saint Thomas (Akhmim), Shrine of Saint Thomas the Hermit 
 White Monastery, Shrine of Saint Shenouda the Archimandrite
 Convent of Saint Damiana, Shrine of Saint Damiana
 Convent of Saint Theodore (Harat al-Rum), Shrine of Saint Marina the Monk
 St. Abraam Coptic Orthodox Monastery, Shrine of Abraam, Bishop of Faiyum
 Monastery of Saint Mina, Shrine of Pope Cyril VI & Saint Menas
 St. George Coptic Orthodox Church (Sporting, Alexandria). Shrine of Abouna Bishoy Kamel
 Saint Mercurius Church in Coptic Cairo, Shrine of Mother Irini
 Monastery of Saint Pishoy, Shrine of Pope Shenouda III & Shrine of Saint Pishoy & Bishop Sarabamon & Saint Paul of Tammah

Kenya 
 National Marian shrine, Subukia

Rwanda 
 Shrine of Our Lady of Sorrows, Kibeho

South Africa 
 Ngome Marian Shrine in Ngome, KwaZulu-Natal

Uganda 
 Uganda Martyrs Shrine, Namugongo

Asia

Cyprus
 The Holy Monastery of the Virgin of Kykkos, near Pedoulas, Nicosia District

India

 National Chrine of Saint Thomas, Chennai, Tamil Nadu.
 Basilica of Bom Jesus, Goa Velha, Goa
 Sanctuary of Our Lady of Velankanni 
 Basilica of Our Lady of the Mount, Bandra, Mumbai
 St. Mary's Basilica, Bangalore Bengaluru, Karnataka
 Shrine of St. Jude Church, Jhansi
 Basilica of Our Lady of Snow (Manjumatha), Pallipport, Pallippuram, Ernakulam, Kerala
 Basilica of Our Lady of Snow, Tuticorin, Tamil Nadu
 Church of Our Lady of Snow, Kallikulam, Tamil Nadu
 Our Lady of Athisaya Manal Matha Sokkankudiyiruppu|Church of Our Lady of Red sand, Sokkankudiyiruppu, Tamil Nadu
 Korattymuthy Shrine of Our Lady with Poovan Bananas, Koratty, Kerala
 St. Sebastian's International Shrine, Alleppey , Kerala
St. Thomas Church, Thumpoly Thumpoly Alappuzha Kerala.
 St. Lawrence Shrine , Karkala , Karnataka
 Malayattoor in Kerala, of the Syro-Malabar Catholic Church - One of the seven international shrines designated by the Vatican.
 National Shrine Basilica of Our Lady of Ransom, Vallarpadom Ernakulam in India
 Our Lady of Lourdes Shrine, Villianur, Puducherry
Our Lady Of Assumption Church, Poomkavu Poomkavu Alappuzha Kerala. 
 Basilica of Our Lady of Lourdes (Poondi), Poondi, Tamil Nadu
 Shrine of St. Antony of Padua, Kaloor Ernakulam in India
 St. George's Forane Church, Edappally, Edappally, Ernakulam in India

Israel
 The Basilica of the Annunciation, in Nazareth.

Japan
 Our Lady of Akita, Akita, Japan.

Lebanon
 Saint Charbel Shrine, Ain Ebel
 Sanctuary of Our Lady of Bechouat, Beqaa Valley
  Shrine of Our Lady of Lebanon, Harissa
 Our Lady of Mantara Shrine, Maghdouché
 Our Lady of Miziara, Mother of Mercies, Miziara, Zgharta District
 Our Lady of Nourieh Shrine and Monastery, Hamat
 Our Lady of the Waterfall Shrine, Jezzine
 Our Lady of Zahle and the Bekaa Chapel, Zahlé

Pakistan
 National Marian Shrine, Mariamabad

Palestine
 Church of All Nations, Jerusalem
 Church of the Nativity, Bethlehem
 Church of the Sepulchre of Saint Mary, Jerusalem

Philippines
 Diocesan Shrine of Nuestra Señora del Buen Suceso, Parañaque, Metro Manila
 Mary, Queen of Peace Shrine, Quezon City, Metro Manila
 National Shrine of Our Lady of Fatima, Valenzuela City, Metro Manila
 National Shrine of Our Mother of Perpetual Help, Baclaran, Parañaque, Metro Manila
Nuestra Senora dela Asuncion Church in Santa Maria, Ilocos Sur
 Our Lady of Caysasay Shrine, Taal, Batangas
 Our Lady of Immaculate Conception Basilica, Malolos, Bulacan province
 Our Lady of Peñafrancia Basilica, Naga City, Bicol Region
 Our Lady of Piat Shrine, Piat, Cagayan
 Our Lady of the Pillar Shrine, Fort Pilar, Zamboanga City, Mindanao
 Our Lady of the Rosary of Manaoag, Manaoag, Pangasinan
 National Shrine of Our Lady of the Holy Rosary, Quezon City
 Archdiocesan Shrine of Christ our Lord of the Holy Sepulcher, Angeles City, Pampanga
 National Shrine of Our Lady of the Visitation of Guibang, Gamu, Isabela
 National Shrine of Our Lady of Peace and Good Voyage, Antipolo
 Diocesan Shrine and Parish of Our Lady of the Abandoned, Marikina
 Minor Basilica of the Black Nazarene, Quiapo, Manila
 National Shrine of Saint Padre Pio of Pietrelcina, San Pedro, Santo Tomas, Batangas
 Mary Help of Christians, National Shrine, Better Living Parañaque City
 Diocesan Shrine of Our Lady of Aranzazu, San Mateo, Rizal

Sri Lanka
 Basilica of Our Lady of Lanka, in Tewatte, Ragama
 Shrine of Our Lady of Madhu in Mannar district
 Shrine of Our Lady of Matara in Matara

Syria
 Our Lady of Saidnaya Monastery, Saidnaya

Turkey
 Church of St. Mary of the Spring, Istanbul
 House of the Virgin Mary, Mt. Bülbüldağı near Selçuk

Vietnam
 Our Lady of La Vang in Quảng Trị, Vietnam

Europe

Andorra
 Our Lady of Meritxell, Meritxell, Canillo

Austria

 Maria Absam Basilica (St. Michael the Archangel Basilica), Absam, Innsbruck-Land District, Tyrol
 Maria Plain Basilica of Our Lady of the Assumption, Bergheim, Salzburg
 Maria Schmolln Sanctuary, Maria Schmolln, Braunau am Inn District, Upper Austria
 Maria Taferl Basilica, Maria Taferl, Melk District, Lower Austria
Mariatrost Basilica, Mariatrost District of Graz, Styria
Mariazell Basilica of the Birth of the Virgin Mary, Mariazell, Styria

Belgium

 Our Lady of Banneux Chapel, Banneux, Liège
 Our Lady of Beauraing Shrine, Beauraing, Namur
 Our Lady of Halle Basilica (Basilica of Saint Martin), Halle, Flemish Brabant
 Our Lady of Scherpenheuvel Basilica, Scherpenheuvel-Zichem, Flemish Brabant
 St. Mary of Oostakker Shrine, Oostakker, Ghent
 Our Lady of Tongeren Basilica, Tongeren, Limburg

Bosnia and Herzegovina
 Our Lady of Međugorje (the Queen of Peace) Shrine, Međugorje
 Our Lady of Olovo Shrine, Olovo
 St John the Baptist Shrine, Podmilačje

Croatia
 Our Lady of Sinj, Sinj, Split-Dalmatia County
 Our Lady of Trsat Shrine, Trsat), Primorje-Gorski Kotar County
 Our Lady Queen of Croatia Basilica, Marija Bistrica, Krapina-Zagorje County
 The Blessed Virgin Mary Church of Aljmaš, Erdut Municipality, Osijek-Baranja County

Czech Republic
 Loreta shrine, Prague
 Pilgrimage Basilica of the Visitation, Hejnice, Liberec District
 The Chapel of St. Wenceslas in St. Vitus Cathedral, Prague

France

 Basilica of Notre-Dame de Fourvière, Lyon, Rhône-Alpes
 Basilica of Our Lady of Hope, Pontmain, Mayenne
 Basilica of Our Lady of La Salette, La Salette-Fallavaux, Isère
 Basilica of Our Lady of Orcival, Orcival, Puy-de-Dôme
 Cathedral of Our Lady of Chartres, Chartres, Eure-et-Loir
 Cathedral of Our Lady of Le Puy, Le Puy-en-Velay, Haute-Loire
 Cathedral of Our Lady of Saint-Omer, Saint-Omer, Pas-de-Calais
 Cathedral of Our Lady of Strasbourg, Strasbourg, Alsace
 Cathedral of Our Lady of Verdun, Verdun, Meuse
 Chapel of Notre Dame du Haut, Ronchamp, Haute-Saône
 Chapel of Our Lady of the Assumption, Villé, Bas-Rhin
 Chapel of Our Lady of the Miraculous Medal, Paris
 Church of Our Lady of Saint-Cordon, Valenciennes, Nord
 Notre Dame de Paris, Paris
 Our Lady of Laus Shrine, Refuge of Sinner, Saint-Étienne-le-Laus, Hautes-Alpes
 Our Lady of the Snows Trappist Monastery, Saint-Laurent-les-Bains, Ardèche
 Pellevoisin Church (Mary, Mother of Mercy), Pellevoisin, Indre
 Sanctuary of Our Lady of Lourdes, Lourdes, Hautes-Pyrénées
 Sanctuary of the Blessed Virgin Mary of Rocamadour, Rocamadour, Lot

Germany
 Shrine of Our Lady of Altötting (Chapel of Grace), Altötting, Bavaria
 Shrine of the Three Kings in Cologne Cathedral, Cologne

Greece
 Mount Athos

Ireland
Knock Shrine (the minor basilica of Our Lady of Knock, Queen of Ireland, Knock, County Mayo

Italy
 The shrine of the Blessed Virgin Mary cathedral at Loreto in Italy
Pontifical Basilica of St. Anthony of Padua, conventual

Latvia
minor basilica of BVM Assumption in Aglona

Malta
the minor basilica of National Shrine of the Blessed Virgin of Ta’ Pinu [BVM Assumption] in Għarb

The Netherlands
The Miracle of the Holy Sacrament in Amsterdam
Our Lady of Help in Heiloo
Sweet Mother in 's-Hertogenbosch
Our Lady, Star of the Sea in Maastricht
Our Lady of the Enclosed Garden in Warfhuizen

Poland
 Divine Mercy Shrine in Płock
 Shrine to the Blessed Virgin Mary in Częstochowa
 Wawel Cathedral of St. Stanislaus and St. Wenceslaus in Kraków
 JHS Divine Mercy in Kraków-Łagiewniki
 Sanctuary of Our Lady of Licheń in Licheń Stary
 Supraśl Orthodox Monastery in Supraśl
 St. John's Cathedral in Warsaw

Portugal

 Shrine of Our Lady of Fátima in Fátima
 Shrine of Christ the King in Almada
 Shrine of Blessed Alexandrina of Balazar in Balazar
 Shrine of Blessed Mary of the Divine Heart in Ermesinde
 Shrine of Our Lady of Sameiro in Braga
 Shrine of Estrela (or the Most Sacred Heart of Jesus) in Lisbon
 Shrine of the Sovereign Mother in Loulé

Spain
 Shrine of the Apostle Saint James the Great at Santiago de Compostela in Galicia, historically the third Catholic pilgrimage destination after Jerusalem and Rome
 Shrine of Our Lady of the Pillar in Zaragoza
 Shrine of Our Lady of Covadonga in Cangas de Onís
 Shrine of Our Lady of Mount Carmel in Garabandal
 Shrine of the Holy Christ of Agony in Limpias
 Shrine of Our Lady of Sorrows of Umbe in Laukiz
 Shrine of Our Lady of Sorrows of Chandavila in La Codosera
 Shrine of Our Lady of Onuva in La Puebla del Río
 Shrine of the Great Promise of the Sacred Heart in Valladolid
 Shrine of Our Lady of Montserrat in Terrassa
 Shrine of Our Lady of Candelaria in Tenerife

Slovakia
Kalvaria Chapel & Shrine in Banska Stiavnica, Slovakia Kalvária Banská Štiavnica

Ukraine
 Pochayiv Lavra

United Kingdom

 Shrine of Our Lady of Cardigan at Cardigan, Wales 
 Shrine of Our Lady of Consolation at West Grinstead, England 
 Shrine of Our Lady of Doncaster in Saint Peter-in-Chains Church, Doncaster, England
 Shrine of Our Lady of Glastonbury at Glastonbury, England 
 Shrine of Our Lady of Ipswich at Saint Mary at the Elms Church, Ipswich, England
 Shrines of Our Lady of Walsingham at Walsingham, England 
 Shrine of Our Lady of Westminster in Westminster Cathedral, City of Westminster, England
 Shrine of Our Lady of Willesden at Willesden, London, England
 Shrine of Saint Alban in St Albans Cathedral, St Albans, England 
 Shrine of Saint Aldhelm in Malmesbury Abbey, Malmesbury, England 
 Shrine of Saint Boniface in the Church of the Holy Cross and the Mother of Him who Hung Thereon, Crediton, England 
 Shrine of Saint Chad in St Chad's Cathedral, Birmingham, England 
 Shrine of Saint Cuthbert in Durham Cathedral, Durham, England 
 Shrine of Saint Edmund in St Edmundsbury Cathedral, Bury St Edmunds, England 
 Shrine of Saint Edward the Confessor in Westminster Abbey, City of Westminster, England 
 Shrine of Saint Ethelbert in Hereford Cathedral, Hereford, England 
 Shrine of Saint Etheldreda in Ely Cathedral, Ely, England 
 Shrine of Saint Francis Cabrini in St George's Cathedral, Southwark, England 
 Shrine of Saint Frideswide in Christ Church Cathedral, Oxford, England 
 Shrine of Saint Gilbert of Sempringham in the Abbey Church of St Andrew, Sempringham, England 
 Shrine of Saint Hilda in Whitby Abbey, Whitby, England 
 Shrine of Saint Hugh of Lincoln in Lincoln Cathedral, Lincoln, England 
 Shrine of Saint John of Beverley in Beverley Minster, Beverley, England 
 Shrine of Saint Jude in the National Shrine of Saint Jude, Faversham, England 
 Shrine of Julian of Norwich in Norwich Cathedral, Norwich 
 Shrine of Saint Osmund in Trinity Chapel, Salisbury Cathedral, Salisbury 
 Shrine of Saint Petroc in Bodmin Parish Church, Bodmin, England 
 Shrine of Saint Swithun in Winchester Cathedral, Winchester, England 
 Shrine of Saint Thomas de Cantilupe in Hereford Cathedral, Hereford, England 
 Shrine of Saint Wilfrid in Ripon Cathedral, Ripon, England 
 Shrine of Saint William of York in York Minster, York, England 
 Shrine of Saint Winifred (now destroyed) in Shrewsbury Abbey, Shrewsbury, England 
 Shrine of Saint Winifred at Holywell, Wales
 Shrine of Saint Wite at the Church of St Candida and Holy Cross, Whitchurch Canonicorum, England 
 Shrine of Saint Wulfstan in Worcester Cathedral, Worcester, England 
 Shrine of the Tyburn Martyrs in Tyburn Convent, London, England

North America

Canada
 Basilica of Sainte-Anne-de-Beaupré, Quebec
 Martyrs' Shrine in Midland, Ontario
Sainte-Anne-du-Bocage in Caraquet, New-Brunswick
 Saint Joseph's Oratory, Montreal
 Notre-Dame-du-Cap Basilica, Trois-Rivières, Quebec
 National Shrine of Our Lady of Perpetual Help, St. Patrick's Church, Toronto, Ontario

Mexico
 Basilica of Our Lady of Guadalupe in Mexico City

United States

Apostle Paul, National Shrine of the; in St. Paul, Minnesota
Assumption of the Blessed Virgin Mary, Basilica of the National Shrine of the; in Baltimore, Maryland
Black Madonna Shrine – see "Our Lady of Czestochowa" (below)
Blessed Francis Xavier Seelos, National Shrine of; in New Orleans, Louisiana
Blessed Sacrament, Shrine of the Most – see "Most Blessed Sacrament, Shrine of the" (below)
Blue Army Shrine of Our Lady of Fátima, National – see "Our Lady of Fátima, National Blue Army Shrine of" (below)
Christ the King, Sovereign Priest, Shrine of; in Chicago, Illinois
Divine Mercy, National Shrine of The; in Stockbridge, Massachusetts
Grotto of Our Lady of Lourdes, National Shrine; in Emmitsburg, Maryland
The Grotto, The National Sanctuary of Our Sorrowful Mother; in Portland, Oregon
Holy Hill National Shrine of Mary, Help of Christians, Basilica of; in Hubertus, Wisconsin
Immaculate Conception, Basilica of the National Shrine of the; in Washington, D.C.
Immaculate Conception, Catholic Shrine of the; in Atlanta, Georgia
Infant Jesus, National Shrine of the; Prague, Oklahoma
Little Flower, Shrine of the; in Nasonville, Rhode Island
Little Flower, National Shrine of the; in Royal Oak, Michigan
Little Flower, Basilica of the National Shrine of the; San Antonio, Texas
Mary, Help of Christians, Basilica of Holy Hill National Shrine of – see "Holy Hill National Shrine of Mary, Help of Christians, Basilica of" (above)
Mary, Queen of the Universe, National Shrine of; in Orlando, Florida
 Maximilian Kolbe, National Shrine of; Libertyville, Illinois
Mission San Xavier del Bac; outside Tucson, Arizona
Most Blessed Sacrament, Shrine of the; in Hanceville, Alabama
"National Shrine" – see "Immaculate Conception, Basilica of the National Shrine of the" (above)
North American Martyrs, National Shrine of the; in Auriesville, New York
Our Lady of Consolation, Basilica and National Shrine of; in Carey, Ohio
Our Lady of Czestochowa:
Our Lady of Czestochowa, National Shrine of; in Doylestown, Pennsylvania
Black Madonna Shrine and Grotto; near Pacific, Missouri
Our Lady of Fátima, National Blue Army Shrine of; Washington Township, New Jersey
Our Lady of La Salette, National Shrine of; Attleboro, Massachusetts
Our Lady of Good Help, Shrine of; Brown County, Wisconsin
Our Lady of Guadalupe:
Our Lady of Guadalupe, Shrine of; in LaCrosse, Wisconsin
Virgin of Guadalupe, The Cathedral Shrine of the; in Dallas, Texas
Our Lady of Martyrs, Shrine of – see "North American Martyrs, National Shrine of the" (above)
Our Lady of Mount Carmel, National Shrine of; in Middletown, New York
Our Lady of Peace Shrine; in Santa Clara, California
Basilica of Our Lady of San Juan del Valle – National Shrine; in San Juan, Texas
Our Lady of the Miraculous Medal, National Shrine of; in Perryville, Missouri
Our Lady of the Miraculous Medal Shrine; Philadelphia, Pennsylvania
Our Lady of the Snows, National Shrine of; in Belleville, Illinois
Our Lady of Victory Basilica and National Shrine; in Lackawanna, New York
National Shrine to Our Lady of Walsingham in Sheboygan, Wisconsin 
St. Ann, Basilica of the National Shrine of; in Scranton, Pennsylvania
St. Bernadette, The Shrine of; in Albuquerque, New Mexico 
St. Elizabeth Ann Seton:
National Shrine of St. Elizabeth Ann Seton; in Emmitsburg, Maryland
Shrine of St. Elizabeth Ann Bayley Seton; in Manhattan, New York
St. Frances Xavier Cabrini (Mother Cabrini):
National Shrine of Saint Frances Xavier Cabrini; in Lincoln Park, Chicago, Illinois
St. Frances Xavier Cabrini Shrine; in Washington Heights, Manhattan, New York
Mother Cabrini Shrine; in Golden, Colorado
Saint Francis of Assisi, National Shrine of; in San Francisco, California
Saint John Neumann, National Shrine of; in Philadelphia, Pennsylvania
Saint Joseph, Shrine of; in St. Louis, Missouri.
St. Jude, National Shrine of; in Chicago, Illinois
St. Kateri Tekawitha, National Shrine of; in Fonda, New York
Saint Katharine Drexel Mission Center and Shrine; in Bensalem Township, Pennsylvania
St. Padre Pio Shrine; in Buena, New Jersey
St. Paul – see "Apostle Paul, National Shrine of the" (above)
Saint Rita of Cascia, National Shrine of; Philadelphia, Pennsylvania
St. Rose Philippine Duchesne Shrine; in St. Charles, Missouri
St. Thérèse of Lisieux – see "Little Flower" (above)
St. Thérèse, National Shrine of; in Darien, Illinois
Virgin of Guadalupe, The Cathedral Shrine of the – see "Our Lady of Guadalupe" (above)

South America

Brazil
Basilica of the National Shrine of Our Lady of Aparecida, Aparecida

Ecuador
National Shrine of Our Lady of El Cisne (Nuestra Señora de el Cisne), in El Cisne, Loja, Ecuador.

Venezuela
 Shrine of Our Lady of Betania, in the State of Miranda
 Shrine of the Virgen de Coromoto (Patroness of Venezuela), Barinas

Oceania

Australia
 St. Mary's Cathedral, Sydney, a minor basilica
 St. Anthony's National Shrine, Hawthorn, Victoria
 National Shrine of Our Lady of Mount Carmel, Melbourne
 National Shrine of Saint Thérèse of Lisieux, Kew, Victoria

Gallery

See also
 List of shrines
 Shrines to the Virgin Mary
 :Category:Islamic shrines
 :Category:Shinto shrines

References